State Route 180 (SR-180) is a state highway in the U.S. state of Utah. Spanning just , it serves as a connector between Interstate 15 and US-89 (State Street) in the city of American Fork.

Route description
State Route 180, a minor arterial connector starts at Interstate 15's southbound ramp for exit 276, a diamond interchange. The route proceeds north on 500 East, crossing the interchange via an overpass, and continues through American Fork for  until terminating at US-89, known locally as State Street.

History
In the late 1950s and early 1960s, Interstate 15 was being constructed in Utah County, parallel to the main north-south thoroughfare, US-89 / US-91 (designated as Route 1 by the state legislature). State Route 180 was established in 1961 to serve as a connector between the new interstate and Route 1. The route has remained unchanged since then, undergoing only wording changes in the description to accommodate the realignment of Route 1 to the interstate, and its subsequent renumbering.

Major intersections

References

180
 180
American Fork, Utah
Streets in Utah